The Armenian National Cinematheque is a film archive located in Yerevan, Armenia.

History 
The archive was founded in 1991, by Garegin Zakoyan, the head of the Film and Television department of the Art Institute of the Armenian National Academy of Sciences.

See also 
 Armenfilm
 Cinema of Armenia
 Cinematheque
 List of film archives
 Moscow Cinema
 National Archives of Armenia

External links 
 National Cinema Center of Armenia

References 

Archives in Armenia
Film archives in Asia
Film archives in Europe